Cylicasta parallela is a species of beetle in the family Cerambycidae. It was described by Melzer in 1934. It is known from Bolivia, Argentina and Brazil.

References

Onciderini
Beetles described in 1934